"All I Know"  is a song by Canadian singer the Weeknd, featuring American rapper Future, from his third studio album Starboy (2016). The song was written by both artists alongside Ahmad Balshe, Ben Billions and Cashmere Cat, being producer by the latter two and the Weeknd. It was one of the tracks of Starboy to be featured in the short film Mania. The song was one of the two collaborations with Future featured on the album, the other being "Six Feet Under". It is the third overall collaboration between the two.

Commercial performance
Like the rest of the tracks from Starboy, "All I Know'" charted on the Billboard Hot 100, reaching number 46. It charted on both the R&B Songs chart and Hot R&B/Hip-Hop Songs chart. The song also charted and peaked at number 38 on the Canadian Hot 100, reaching the Top 40.

Charts

Certifications

References 

2016 songs
The Weeknd songs
Future (rapper) songs
Songs written by Cashmere Cat
Songs written by Belly (rapper)
Songs written by Future (rapper)
Songs written by the Weeknd
Songs written by Ben Billions
Song recordings produced by Cashmere Cat
Song recordings produced by the Weeknd